The Battle of Tallushatchee was a battle fought during the War of 1812 and Creek War on November 3, 1813, in Alabama between Native American Red Stick Creeks and United States dragoons. A cavalry force commanded by Brigadier General John Coffee was able to defeat the Creek warriors.

Background
After the massacre at Fort Mims, General Andrew Jackson assembled an army of 2,500 Tennessee militia.  Jackson began marching into Mississippi Territory to combat the Red Stick Creeks.  Jackson's troops began to construct Fort Strother along the Coosa River.  15 miles (24 km) away from the fort lay the Creek village of Tallasseehatchee, where a sizeable force of Red Stick warriors were.  Jackson ordered his friend and most trusted subordinate, General John Coffee, to attack the village.

Battle
Coffee took about 900 dragoons and arrived on November 3 at the village, where he divided his brigade into two columns that encircled the town.  Two companies ventured into the center of the circle to draw out the warriors.  The trap worked: The warriors attacked and were forced to retreat back into the buildings of the village.  Coffee closed the circle in on the trapped warriors. Davy Crockett, serving in the Tennessee Militia, commented, "We shot 'em down like dogs." In his memoirs he also described participating in burning down a house where 46 Creek warriors and their families had taken refuge.

Coffee's forces killed 186 warriors, as well as many women and children, while suffering only 5 dead and 41 wounded.

Writing about the event years later, Richard K. Call recalled:

"The next morning after our march we entered the Indian village, and here I first saw the carnage of the battle field. I saw it in its worst aspect – when the hour of danger had passed, when I could excite no feeling or passion in my breast, to control my sympathy and sorrow for human suffering. It was to me a horrible and revolting scene – the battle had ended in the village, the warriors fighting in their board houses, which gave little protection against the rifle bullets or musket ball. They fought in the midst of their wives and children, who frequently shared their bloody fate. They fought bravely to the last, none asking or receiving quarter, nor did resistance cease until the last warrior had fallen. Humanity might well have wept over the gory scene before us. We found as many as eight or ten dead bodies in a single cabin, sometimes the dead mother clasped the dead child to her breast, and to add another appalling horror to the bloody catalogue – some of the cabins had taken fire, and half consumed human bodies were seen amidst the smoking ruins. In other instances dogs had torn and feasted on the mangled bodies of their masters. Heartsick I turned from the revolting scene. Very different seems the picture in the cool moment of inaction than in the excitement of battle – in the one – passion, the desire to triumph, and vengeance make demons, in the other as the brain becomes more composed, the pulse to beat less quickly, the heart resumes its sway – and it would be a relief to shed tears over the carnage around us – I remember an instant of a brave young soldier, who after fighting like a tiger until the engagement was over, fainted at the sight of the blood he had helped to spill."

This battle was the first battle in General Andrew Jackson's military campaign.  A week later, General Jackson inflicted another serious defeat on the Red Sticks at the Battle of Talladega.

References

Sources

External links
A map of Creek War Battle Sites from the PCL Map Collection at the University of Texas at Austin.
"Tallasseehatchee Historical Marker"

Tallushatchee
Tallushatchee
Native American history of Alabama
November 1813 events
1813 in the United States
Tallushatchee